Orthostethus is a genus of click beetles in the family Elateridae. There are at least two described species in Orthostethus.

Species
These two species belong to the genus Orthostethus:
 Orthostethus caviceps Schaeffer, 1916 b
 Orthostethus infuscatus (Germar, 1844) g b
Data sources: i = ITIS, c = Catalogue of Life, g = GBIF, b = Bugguide.net

References

Further reading

External links

 

Elaterinae